The Transylvanian Military Frontier was a territory in the Habsburg monarchy. It was a section of the Habsburg Military Frontier.

History
It was founded in 1762 from territories that had been part of the Habsburg Principality of Transylvania. After it was abolished, the territory of the Transylvanian Military Frontier was reincorporated into the principality.

Borders
Within the Habsburg monarchy the Transylvanian Military Frontier bordered the Principality of Transylvania and the Kingdom of Hungary in the northwest, the Banatian Military Frontier in the southwest, and Bukovina (part of Galicia and Lodomeria until 1849, a separate duchy thereafter) in the northeast. It also bordered the Ottoman vassal principalities of Wallachia and Moldavia in the southeast.

Regiments

The Transylvanian Military Frontier was composed of two Romanian regiments, two Székely regiments, and a Hussars regiment, garrisoned as follows:
  at Orlat 
  at Năsăud
 1st Székely Regiment at Miercurea Ciuc 
 2nd Székely Regiment at Târgu Secuiesc
 Hussar border guards at Sfântu Gheorghe

See also
Military Frontier
Principality of Transylvania (1711–1867)
History of Transylvania
Transylvania

External links
Transylvanian Military Frontier in 1815–1818

1762 establishments in the Habsburg monarchy
1851 disestablishments in the Austrian Empire
States and territories established in 1762
Habsburg Transylvania
Military Frontier